

Vladimir Chiorescu (born 1887, Chișinău - died 20th century) was a Bessarabian politician.

Biography 
He served as Member of the Moldovan Parliament (1917–1918). On March 27, 1918, Vladimir Chiorescu voted the Union of Bessarabia with Romania.

Gallery

Bibliography 
Gheorghe E. Cojocaru, Sfatul Țării: itinerar, Civitas, Chişinău, 1998, 
Mihai Taşcă, Sfatul Țării şi actualele autorităţi locale, "Timpul de dimineaţă", no. 114 (849), June 27, 2008 (page 16)

External links 
 Arhiva pentru Sfatul Tarii
 Deputaţii Sfatului Ţării şi Lavrenti Beria

Notes

1887 births
Year of death missing
Politicians from Chișinău
People from Kishinyovsky Uyezd
Moldovan MPs 1917–1918